Events from the year 1991 in Iran.

Incumbents
 Supreme Leader: Ali Khamenei
 President: Akbar Hashemi Rafsanjani 
 Vice President: Hassan Habibi
 Chief Justice: Mohammad Yazdii

Events

The United Nations Security Council identified Iraq as the aggressor of the Iran–Iraq War on 9 December 1991

Births

 23 September – Bakhtiar Rahmani.
 22 November  – Amir Sharafi.

See also
 Years in Iraq
 Years in Afghanistan

References

 
Iran
Years of the 20th century in Iran
1990s in Iran
Iran